Eupithecia antiqua is a moth in the family Geometridae. It is found in south-western China (Yunnan).

The wingspan is about 21 mm. The forewings are grey with dark brown markings and the hindwings are dirty white.

References

Moths described in 2004
antiqua
Moths of Asia